Casein paint, (or cassein) derived from milk casein (milk protein), is a fast-drying, water-soluble medium used by artists.

Description
It generally has a glue-like consistency, but can be thinned with water to the degree that fits a particular artist's style and desired result. It can be used on canvas panels, illustration boards, paper, wood, and masonite. Because the dried paint film is inflexible and brittle, it is not appropriate for heavy impasto on flexible supports like canvas; canvas laminated to board is more suitable. Casein paint is reworkable and can be used for underpainting. It generally dries to a matte finish.

Uses
Casein paint has been used since ancient Egyptian times as a form of distemper paint, and is still used today. One of the qualities for which artists value casein paint is that unlike gouache, it dries to an even consistency, making it ideal for murals. Also, it can visually resemble oil painting more than most other water-based paints, and works well as an underpainting.

Casein paint loses its solubility with time and exposure and becomes water-resistant. It is suited most to inflexible surfaces, including furniture. It can be buffed to a soft velvet finish when dry, or varnished for a gloss finish.

Manufacture
The binder for casein paint is made by dissolving casein in an alkali, usually lime, ammonium carbonate, or borax. Casein itself is precipitated from milk by the action of an acid or the enzyme rennet.  Lime casein works well on porous surfaces, even outdoors, though it has a short shelf-life and must be used with pigments that are balanced against the binder's low pH.  Ammonium carbonate casein has similar strengths and weaknesses.  Borax casein has a shelf-life of several weeks, is pH neutral, and can be used outdoors through the addition of linseed oil.

Casein artists
Yantonai Dakota artist Oscar Howe of South Dakota used casein extensively.

Santa Clara Pueblo artist Pablita Velarde created a series of more than 70 paintings of everyday Native American life in New Mexico for Bandelier National Monument between 1937 and 1943, painted mostly on masonite using casein paints.

Casein was widely used by commercial illustrators as the material of choice until the late 1960s when, with the advent of acrylic paint, casein became less popular. John Berkey continued to use casein in combination with acrylics in most of his paintings. Dick Tracy (1960), and Popeye (1960), two early paintings by Andy Warhol, who had been a commercial illustrator before becoming a fine artist, were painted with casein.

See also
 Milk paint

References

External links
A Simple Recipe for the Casein Binder

Watermedia